Ro Teimumu Vuikaba Kepa (born 18 December 1945) is a Fijian chief, former Member of the Parliament of Fiji, and former leader of the Social Democratic Liberal Party. She was the first Fijian woman to serve as Leader of the Opposition.  She previously held the position of deputy Prime Minister in the Qarase-led Soqosoqo Duavata ni Lewenivanua (SDL) government from 2001 to 2006. As the paramount chief of the Burebasaga Confederacy, she holds the title Roko Tui Dreketi.

Personal life
Kepa is originally from Lomanikoro, Rewa, and has maternal links to Nadroga. She graduated from the University of the South Pacific with a Bachelor of Arts, and served as Principal of Corpus Christi College and then as a students' coordinator at the University of the South Pacific.

She succeeded her late sister, former Ro Lady Lala Mara, as Roko Tui Dreketi, or Paramount Chief of Burebasaga, in 2004.  This is considered to be the highest title in the Burebasaga Confederacy, one of three "confederacies", or tribal networks, of Fijian chiefs.

Ro Teimumu Kepa is the widow of Sailosi Kepa, a former High Commissioner to London, Minister of Justice and Attorney General (1988–1992), who went on to become a High Court Judge, Ombudsman, and first chairman of Fiji's Human Rights Commission.

In July 2016, Kepa was awarded a Peace Award by the Universal Peace Federation in Nepal and was accorded as a Global Peace Ambassador or Ambassador for Peace.

Political career
In 1999 Kepa was appointed to the Senate.  Following the 2000 Fijian coup d'état she was appointed as Minister for Women, Culture, and Social Welfare in the interim government of Laisenia Qarase. She contested the 2001 election as a candidate for the Soqosoqo Duavata ni Lewenivanua in the Rewa communal constituency, winning it with 2,636 votes. Following the election she was appointed as Minister for Education.

On 5 May 2005 she was elected as chairperson of the Rewa Provincial Council, a position previously held by her sister Ro Lady Lala Mara. This led to claims that she had forfeited her seat in Parliament, resulting in her resigning from the council in August 2005.

In October 2005, Kepa was elected to the executive board of UNESCO, to which the Fijian government had nominated her in late September.

Kepa stood again for Rewa in the 2006 election, defeating her nephew, Ro Filipe Tuisawau. She was reappointed as Minister for Education, Youth and Sports in the multi-party cabinet. When the Qarase government was deposed by the 2006 Fijian coup d'état, Kepa joined a court case challenging the legality of the coup. She also used her position in the Great Council of Chiefs to oppose the coup, and was instrumental in the Council's 2007 rejection of Epeli Nailatikau nomination as Vice-President. As a result, the Council was suspended.

In May 2007, Kepa was threatened by the military over her opposition to the coup. However she continued to speak out against the regime and its People's Charter for Change, Peace and Progress. In July 2009 she was arrested and charged with breaching public emergency regulations and conspiracy to cause disorder after offering that her province would host the annual conference of the Methodist Church of Fiji and Rotuma, which the military regime had banned. The charges were later dropped. In 2011 the military regime suspended the Rewa Provincial Council in another effort to silence her.

In March 2014 Kepa was elected leader of the newly formed Social Democratic Liberal Party. She led the party into the 2014 election. The party won 15 of the 50 parliamentary seats; Kepa, who won 49,485 votes in her own name, was the second-highest ranked candidate behind Bainimarama. On 6 October 2014 Kepa was appointed Leader of the Opposition.

In June 2016, Kepa announced that she was standing down as leader of SODELPA. She was replaced by former Prime Minister Sitiveni Rabuka. She was re-elected in the 2018 elections, winning 6,036 votes, the second-highest of any female candidate.

2021 Fijian presidential election
On 22 October 2021, Kepa was nominated as the opposition SODELPA party's candidate for the position of president of Fiji. She was able to gain the support of 23 MPs, but was defeated by the government's candidate, Wiliame Katonivere, in the first round of voting. One opposition MP, Mosese Bulitavu of SODELPA, had also voted for Katonivere. Had she been elected, Kepa would have been the first woman to hold the presidency of Fiji.

References

Further reading

|-

|-

|-

|-

1945 births
Living people
Fijian chiefs
I-Taukei Fijian members of the House of Representatives (Fiji)
I-Taukei Fijian members of the Parliament of Fiji
I-Taukei Fijian members of the Senate (Fiji)
Roko Tui Dreketi
Social Democratic Liberal Party politicians
Soqosoqo Duavata ni Lewenivanua politicians
University of the South Pacific alumni
Academic staff of the University of the South Pacific
Politicians from Lomanikoro
Leaders of the Opposition (Fiji)
21st-century Fijian women politicians
21st-century Fijian politicians
Women government ministers of Fiji
Culture ministers of Fiji
Education ministers of Fiji
Social affairs ministers of Fiji
Women's ministers of Fiji
Deputy Prime Ministers of Fiji